A constitutional referendum was held in the Maldives on 18 August 2007 to decide on whether the country should have a presidential system or a parliamentary system. President of the Maldives Maumoon Abdul Gayoom supported a presidential system while the opposition Maldivian Democratic Party favored a parliamentary system.

Official results showed the presidential system winning over 60% support. Gayoom called the result a "massive endorsement" and confirmed that he would be a candidate in the 2008 presidential election. The opposition alleged that the referendum was rigged.

Results

References

2007
2007 referendums
Constitutional referendum
Constitutional referendums
August 2007 events in Asia